Duncan Stewart (born c. 1860) was a Scottish footballer who played as a full back.

Career
Stewart played club football for Morton, Port Glasgow Athletic, Dumbarton and internationally for Scotland.

Honours
Dumbarton
 Dumbartonshire Cup: Winners 1888-1889
 Greenock Charity Cup: Runners Up 1888-89
 1 cap for Scotland in 1888;
 5 representative matches for Dumbartonshire between 1887 and 1890.

See also
List of Scotland national football team captains

References

External links

London Hearts profile

1860 births
Year of birth uncertain
Scottish footballers
Scotland international footballers
Greenock Morton F.C. players
Port Glasgow Athletic F.C. players
Dumbarton F.C. players
Association football fullbacks
Year of death missing
Place of death missing